The Polish Academy Award for Best TV Series has been awarded annually since 2015 by the Polish Film Academy. Award is given to the director, main producer and original broadcaster of the series.

Winner and nominees

External links 
 http://www.pnf.pl

Polish film awards
Awards established in 2015
Television awards